The .30 Carbine (7.62×33mm) is a rimless carbine/rifle cartridge used in the M1 carbine introduced in the 1940s. It is a light rifle round designed to be fired from the M1 carbine's 18-inch (458 mm) barrel.

History

Shortly before World War II, the U.S. Army started a "light rifle" project to provide support personnel and rear area units a weapon with more firepower and accuracy than the standard issue M1911A1 .45 ACP handgun and half the weight of the standard issue M1 Garand .30-06 rifle or the .45 ACP Thompson submachine gun. 

The .30 Carbine cartridge was developed by Winchester and is basically a rimless .30 caliber (7.62 mm) version of the much older .32 Winchester Self-Loading cartridge of 1906 introduced for the Winchester Model 1905 rifle. (The .30 Carbine's relatively straight case and round nose bullet have misled some to believe it was designed for use in pistols.) The .30 Carbine uses a lighter bullet (110 grain versus 165 grain) and improved powder. As a result, it has approximately 41% higher muzzle velocity with 27% more impact energy than the parent .32 WSL cartridge. 

At first, Winchester was tasked with developing the cartridge but did not submit a carbine design. Other firms and individual designers submitted several carbine designs, but most prototypes were either unreliable or grossly off the target weight of five pounds. Army Ordnance Major Rene Studler persuaded Winchester that the Winchester M2 .30-06 rifle, a design started by Ed Browning and perfected by Winchester engineers including Marshall "Carbine" Williams, could be scaled down for the .30 Carbine cartridge. The result was the M1 carbine.

The M1 carbine was issued to infantry officers; machine gun, artillery and tank crews; paratroopers; and other line-of-communications personnel in lieu of the larger, heavier M1 Garand. The weapon was originally issued with a 15-round detachable magazine. The carbine and cartridge were not intended to serve as a primary infantry weapon, nor was it comparable to more powerful intermediate cartridges later developed for assault rifles. The M2 carbine was introduced late in World War II with a selective-fire switch allowing optional fully automatic fire at a rather high rate (850–900 rpm) and a 30-round magazine.

The M1 and M2 carbines continued in service during the Korean War. A postwar U.S. Army evaluation reported that "[t]here are practically no data bearing on the accuracy of the carbine at ranges in excess of 50 yards. The record contains a few examples of carbine-aimed fire felling an enemy soldier at this distance or perhaps a little more. But they are so few in number that no general conclusion can be drawn from them. Where carbine fire had proven killing effect, approximately 95 percent of the time the target was dropped at less than 50 yards." The evaluation also reported that "[c]ommanders noted that it took two to three engagements at least to settle their men to the automatic feature of the carbine so that they would not greatly waste ammunition under the first impulse of engagement. By experience, they would come to handle it semiautomatically, but it took prolonged battle hardening to bring about this adjustment in the human equation."

Development
The first cartridges were made by turning down rims on .32SL cases and loading with .308 caliber bullets which had a similar profile to those of the U.S. military .45 ACP bullets. The first 100,000 cartridges manufactured were headstamped ".30 SL" (for "self-loading").

Civilian use
The popularity of the M1 carbine for collecting, sporting, and re-enactment use has resulted in continued civilian popularity of the .30 Carbine cartridge. For hunting, it is considered a small-to-medium-game cartridge.

Handguns

A number of handguns have been chambered for .30 Carbine ammunition. In 1944, Smith & Wesson developed a hand-ejector revolver to fire .30 Carbine. It went through 1,232 rounds without incident. The loud blast is the most oft-mentioned characteristic of the .30 Carbine cartridge when fired in a handgun.

In 1958, the short-lived J. Kimball Arms Co. produced a .30 Carbine caliber pistol that closely resembled a slightly scaled-up High Standard Field King .22 target pistol. The Ruger Blackhawk revolver chambered for the .30 Carbine round has been in the catalogs since the late 1960s.

Plainfield Machine Corp. made a .30 caliber pistol from 1964 to 1983 named the "Enforcer". While similar to the M1 carbine, it lacked the stock, thereby making it a handgun. Sold to Iver Johnson in 1983, the Enforcer continued in production until 1986. Other handguns chambered for this cartridge include the Thompson-Center Contender.

Plainfield Machine produced M1 carbines from 1960 to 1977, when they were bought out by Iver Johnson Corp, who has manufactured them at least until a 50th anniversary model in 1993. The Taurus Raging Thirty and AMT AutoMag III were also offered in .30 Carbine.

Comparison

The .30 Carbine was developed from the .32 Winchester Self-Loading used in an early semi-auto sporting rifle.

Therefore, the M1 carbine is significantly less powerful than the M1 Garand.

As a hunting arm, the M1 carbine is approximately the equivalent to a .357 Magnum lever-action rifle. .30 Carbine sporting ammunition is factory recommended for hunting and control of large vermin like fox, javelina, and coyote. However, the game laws of several states do not allow hunting big game (e.g., deer, bear, or boar) with the .30 Carbine either by name or by minimum muzzle energy required.

Chambered firearms

Rifles 
Alpine u.s. carbine
Armalon AL30C
Browning 1941 carbine
CEAM Modèle 1950
Chapina carbine
Cristobal carbine
Excel Arms X30R
FAMAE CT-30
Franchi LF-58
Garand carbine
Hezi SM-1
Hillberg carbine
IMI Magal
M1 carbine
M2 carbine
M1944 Hyde carbine
Marlin Levermatic Model 62
Southern Gun Company La-30
Taurus Carabina CT-30
Thompson Light Rifle
Universal Arms .30 Carbine
Victor Sarasqueta STABLE/ARMU

Handguns 

AMT AutoMag III
Excel Arms X-30
Inland Manufacturing M30-P pistol
Kimball (standard, target, aircrew)
Ruger Blackhawk
Taurus Raging Thirty
Universal Enforcer

Users
 (1950s–1970s, Austrian Army and police)
 (1940s–1950s, border guard)
 (present, BOPE)
 (1967–1975)
 Korean War through the 1950s 
 Used by Fidel Castro's 26th of July Movement during the Cuban Revolution  (1953 - 1959)
 (1950–1990)

 WWII lend-lease, First Indochina War and (1954–1962, Algerian War). Manufactured as the Modèle 50 pour Carabine cartridge.
 (German border guard, some police forces and German Army paratroopers (1950s-1960s))
 (Hellenic (Greek) Air Force until mid-1980s)
: Used by Indonesian Armed Forces in 1950s-1960s
 (1945–1957, Israeli Defence Forces; 1970s–present, Israeli Police; 1974–present, civil guard)
 (Carabinieri, as of 1992)
 (National police reserve) (1950–1989)
 

 (Police departments and security forces)
 (1940s–1970s, army and police)
 (1960s-present, police and border guard)
 (Norwegian Army 1951–1970, with some Norwegian police units until the 1990s)
 (Post-WWII)
 (1950s–present, reserve force)
 (?–present, army)
  (1950s–1970s)
 (Republic of China) (1950s–present)
 Locally known as the ปสบ.87
 WWII Lend-Lease
 (1940s–1970s, armed forces) and some law enforcement agencies (1940s–present)
 (Captured batches)

Cartridge types
Common types used by the military with the carbine include:

Cartridge, caliber .30, carbine, ball, M1 - It came in cartons of 50 cartridges.
Cartridge, caliber .30, carbine, grenade, M6 - The grenade blank was used with the M8 rifle grenade launcher. It came in cartons of six cartridges. Cartons issued in metal ammo cans were made of plain pasteboard, while individual cartons were sealed and waterproofed with a wax coating.   
Cartridge, dummy, caliber .30, carbine, M13 - This cartridge was used to safely teach loading and unloading the M1 carbine to recruits.
Cartridge, caliber .30, carbine, ball, high pressure test, M18 - This cartridge was used to proof the carbine and its components at the factory or an army arsenal.
Cartridge, caliber .30, carbine, tracer, M27 - It came in cartons of 50 cartridges.
7,62mm Kurz - The NATO designation for .30 Carbine ball M1 ammunition. It was first issued to the West German police forces and the auxiliaries in the Western Occupied Zones of Berlin, explaining its German-language designation. France used ammunition with this designation in Algeria.

Synonyms
.30 M1 Carbine
7.62×33mm
.30 SL

As a parent case
The .30 Carbine was the basis for Melvin M. Johnson's .22 Spitfire (5.7x33mm), necking the .30 Carbine's case down to a .22 caliber bullet. It was designed to improve the range and stopping power of the M1 carbine. The Plainfield Machine Company (later taken over by Iver Johnson's Arms) sold a sporting rifle copy of the M1 carbine chambered for this cartridge but only about 500 were made.

See also
7 mm caliber
7.62 mm caliber
List of handgun cartridges
List of rifle cartridges
Table of handgun and rifle cartridges

Notes

References 
 S.L.A. Marshall, Commentary on Infantry and Weapons in Korea 1950–51, 1st Report ORO-R-13 of 27 October 1951, Project Doughboy [Restricted], Operations Research Office (ORO), U.S. Army
 Cumpston, Mike, "The .30 Carbine Blackhawk: Ruger's Enduring Dark Horse",  Guns Magazine, December 2001, San Diego, Von Rosen Publications

 
Pistol and rifle cartridges
Military cartridges
Paramilitary cartridges
Winchester Repeating Arms Company cartridges